Biemnidae is a family of sponges belonging to the order Biemnida.

Genera:
 Biemna Gray, 1867
 Neofibularia Hechtel, 1965
 Sigmaxinella Dendy, 1897

References

Heteroscleromorpha
Sponge families